This article lists events from the year 2016 in Angola.

Incumbents
 President: José Eduardo dos Santos
 Vice President: Manuel Vicente

Events
20 January – 2016 Angola and DR Congo yellow fever outbreak

Sport
5-21 August – Angola at the 2016 Summer Olympics: 25 competitors in 7 sports

Deaths

27 February – Lúcio Lara, politician (b. 1929).

3 June – Henrique N'zita Tiago, separatist politician (b. 1927).

References

Links

 
2010s in Angola
Years of the 21st century in Angola
Angola
Angola